Jiggy may refer to:


People
 Jiggy Manicad (born 1974), Filipino television journalist
 Jiggy Smaha, American football player in the Canadian Football League

Arts and entertainment
 Jiggy, a collectable item in the Banjo-Kazooie video game series
 Jiggy McCue, protagonist of Michael Lawrence's series of children's books
 Jiggy Pepper, a recurring character in Tegami Bachi, a Japanese manga series
 "Jiggy", 2010 debut single by F.Cuz, a South Korean boy band
 "Jiggy (Whiz)", a 2021 single by British rapper ArrDee

Other uses
 jiggy, a derogatory term for a black person - see List of ethnic slurs and epithets by ethnicity

See also
 Jig